Parapercis xanthozona, the yellowbar sandperch, is a fish species in the sandperch family, Pinguipedidae. 
It is found in the Indo-West Pacific from East Africa to Fiji.

References

Randall, J.E., G.R. Allen and R.C. Steene, 1990. Fishes of the Great Barrier Reef and Coral Sea. University of Hawaii Press, Honolulu, Hawaii. 506 p. 

Pinguipedidae
Taxa named by Pieter Bleeker
Fish described in 1849